Adelpherupa flavescens is a species of moth of the family Crambidae. It is found in Benin, Kenya, Malawi, Mozambique, Niger, Nigeria, Senegal, Sudan, Tanzania and Uganda.

The larvae feed on Oryza species.

References

Moths described in 1919
Schoenobiinae
Moths of Sub-Saharan Africa